Vincent "Vinnie" William Pestano (born February 20, 1985) is an American former professional baseball relief pitcher.

Early life
Pestano attended Canyon High School (Anaheim, California) and California State University, Fullerton before being drafted by the Cleveland Indians in the 20th round of the 2006  MLB draft. Since 2007, Pestano has played in minor league baseball with the Columbus Clippers, Akron Aeros, Mahoning Valley Scrappers, Lake County Captains, and Kinston Indians.

Major league career
Pestano's contract was purchased from Triple-A Columbus by the Indians on September 23, 2010. He made his MLB debut the same day, pitching one scoreless inning in relief.

On August 7, 2014, Pestano was traded to the Los Angeles Angels of Anaheim in exchange for Class-A pitcher Mike Clevinger. He was recalled by the Angels on August 10 after one game with the Triple-A Salt Lake Bees, but was sent back down on August 16 after just one appearance with the Angels. On July 28, 2015  he was designated for assignment to make roster room for David DeJesus and David Murphy.

On February 5, 2016, Pestano signed a minor league deal with the New York Yankees.

On April 4, 2017, Pestano signed with the Bridgeport Bluefish of the Atlantic League of Professional Baseball.

On November 1, 2017, Pestano was drafted by the Long Island Ducks in the Bridgeport Bluefish dispersal draft. On March 29, 2018, Pestano signed with the Ducks for the 2018 season. He announced his retirement on June 13, 2018.

Pitching style
Pestano throws three pitches. His main pitch is a four-seam fastball that is typically thrown between 90–93 mph. His secondary pitch is a breaking ball in the low 80s that is referred to by various sources as a curveball or a slider. He also occasionally throws a two-seam fastball.

In popular culture
Pestano was referenced in season 8, episode 4 (Who Wants to be a Godparent?) of How I Met Your Mother. After Barney supposedly throws a brick through an upper-story window in a flashback, Ted doubtingly says, "Yeah right. I've seen Barney throw, he's no Vinnie Pestano, am I right? ...Beloved Indians middle reliever!"

References

External links 

1985 births
Living people
Akron Aeros players
Baseball players from California
Bridgeport Bluefish players
Cleveland Indians players
Columbus Clippers players
Kinston Indians players
Lake County Captains players
Long Island Ducks players
Los Angeles Angels players
Mahoning Valley Scrappers players
Major League Baseball pitchers
Peoria Saguaros players
Salt Lake Bees players
World Baseball Classic players of the United States
2013 World Baseball Classic players